Martin Štěpánek may refer to:

 Martin Štěpánek (actor) (1947–2010), Czech actor and politician
 Martin Štěpánek (free-diver) (born 1977), Czech free-diver
 Martin Štěpánek (tennis), Czech tennis player and coach
 Martin Štěpánek (ice hockey), Czech ice hockey player, see 2000 IIHF World Championship rosters